Karl Lieffen (17 May 1926 – 13 January 1999), born Karel František Lifka, was a German film actor. He appeared in more than 140 films on screen and television between 1949 and 1998.

He was born in Ossegg (Osek), Czechoslovakia and attended drama classes at Brunswick and the Heer School of Music in Bückeburg. In 1946 he started his theatre career in Freiburg followed by engagements at the Hessian State Theatre in Wiesbaden, the Munich Kammerspiele and the Opern- und Schauspielhaus Frankfurt. In 1975 he joined the ensemble of the Bavarian State Theatre (Residenz Theatre) in Munich. From the 1950s on Lieffen became known to a wider public for his film appearances, like the role of the brisk chauffeur Fritz in Billy Wilder's One, Two, Three. He died in Starnberg, Germany.

Selected filmography

 Encounter with Werther (1949) - Bediensteter Bursche
 Sensation in Savoy (1950)
 The Beggar Student (1956) - Major Wangenheim
 Haie und kleine Fische (1957) - Dr. Timmler
 Eva küßt nur Direktoren (1958) - Herr Fuchs
 Mikosch, the Pride of the Company (1958) - Stabsarzt
 Resurrection (1958)
 Wir Wunderkinder (1958) - Wehackel (uncredited)
 A Song Goes Round the World (1958) - Pianist Schlange
 Nick Knatterton’s Adventure (1959) - Nick Knatterton
 Dorothea Angermann (1959)
 Melodie und Rhythmus (1959) - Otto Mattusch
 The Beautiful Adventure (1959) - Fotograf Fortuné Tallon
 The Death Ship (1959) - Belgischer Kripobeamter
 The Man Who Walked Through the Wall (1959) - Herr Hintz - der Dandy
 Love Now, Pay Later (1959) - Zuhälter
 Ein Tag, der nie zu Ende geht (1959) - McGlade
 Orientalische Nächte (1960) - Pierre
 Der Schleier fiel (1960)
 Conny and Peter Make Music (1960) - Grossi
 A Woman for Life (1960) - Magier
 Die Brücke des Schicksals (1960)
 Agatha, Stop That Murdering! (1960) - Thomas Lorenzen
 The Time Has Come (1960, TV series) - Pelford
 Hamlet (1961) - Osric
  (1961) - Dr. Hellwig
 Die Ehe des Herrn Mississippi (1961) - Santamaria
 One, Two, Three (1961) - Fritz
 Toller Hecht auf krummer Tour (1961) - Moritz
 Wenn beide schuldig werden (1962) - Ulbach, Landtagsabgeordneter
 Verrückt und zugenäht (1962) - Kralle Kaktus, Gewohnheitsganove
 The Pirates of the Mississippi (1963) - Doc Monrove
 Walt Disney's Wonderful World of Color (1963, Episode: "") - Stieglitz
 Piccadilly null Uhr zwölf (1963) - Lee Costello
 The Defector (1966) - Major Windisch
 When Night Falls on the Reeperbahn (1967) - Karlchen Dincke
 Jack of Diamonds (1967) - Helmut
 Heidi (1968, TV Movie) - Sebastian
 Dem Täter auf der Spur (1968–1973, TV Series) - Inspecteur Janot
  (1969) - Grundeis, Prosecutor
 Angels of the Street (1969) - Radensky
 Don't Get Angry (1972) - Max
 Derrick (1974–1998, TV Series) - Lagusta / Johannes Brusius / Heinrich Gruga / Herr Sparke (final appearance)
 Tadellöser & Wolff (1975, TV Mini-Series) - Karl Kempowski
 Goetz von Berlichingen of the Iron Hand (1979) - Assessor Olearius
 It Can Only Get Worse (1979)
 Ein gutes Land (1982)
 Lass das – ich hass das (1983) - Onkel Franz
 The Roaring Fifties (1983) - Major Blaschenko
 Die leichten Zeiten sind vorbei (1983)
 Otto – Der Film (1985) - Floppmann
 Nägel mit Köpfen (1986) - Industrieller
 Die Wächter (1986, TV miniseries) - Doctor White
  (1995) - Buselmeier
  (1996) - Grandpa Gustav

References

External links

1926 births
1999 deaths
Sudeten German people
People from Teplice District
German male film actors
German male television actors
Naturalized citizens of Germany
Recipients of the Cross of the Order of Merit of the Federal Republic of Germany
20th-century German male actors